Lübberstedt is a railway station on the Bremen–Bremerhaven line, situated in the village of Lübberstedt in the district of Osterholz in Lower Saxony, one of the states of Germany.

Operational usage
RegionalBahn trains from Bremerhaven to Bremen call at the station, offering an hourly connection to both cities, with some peak services during the early morning and afternoon hours.

References

Railway stations in Lower Saxony
Osterholz